The USC Center on Public Diplomacy (CPD) was established in 2003 as a partnership between the USC Annenberg School for Communication and the USC Dornsife College of Letters, Arts and Sciences' School of International Relations at the University of Southern California. It is a research, analysis and professional education organization dedicated to furthering the study and practice of global public engagement and cultural relations.

In 2008, USC received the Benjamin Franklin Award for Public Diplomacy from the U.S. State Department in recognition of the university's teaching, training and research in public diplomacy.

Center leadership is provided by Jay Wang, director of the USC Center on Public Diplomacy. The center is a full member of the Association of Professional Schools of International Affairs (APSIA), a group of public policy, public administration, and international studies schools.

People associated with the center

Advisory board
 Mel Levine (Chair)
 Vartan Gregorian (Honorary)
 David Huebner
 Gary E. Knell
 Markos Kounalakis
 Lindsey Kozberg
 Kimberly Marteau Emerson
 Mike Medavoy
 Ponchitta Pierce
 Barry Sanders
 Jay Snyder

Academic staff 
 Nicholas J. Cull is professor of public diplomacy and director of the master's program in public diplomacy at USC.

References 

 "Online Virtual World Is Part Fantasy, Part Civics Experiment" by Christopher T. Heun, InformationWeek,  Nov. 8, 2005
 "Video Game World Gives Peace a Chance," by Mike Musgrove, Washington Post, October 16, 2005

External links 
 USC Center on Public Diplomacy website

Diplomacy
Foreign relations of the United States
Centers of the University of Southern California
Research institutes of international relations
Educational organizations based in the United States